Gerald Ross (born September 26, 1954, Detroit) is a musician specializing in American Roots Music – Swing, Early Jazz, Western Swing, Hawaiian, Ragtime and Blues.  Playing the guitar, lap steel guitar and ukulele he has performed throughout the USA and Europe and has recorded seven solo CDs.  Ross currently tours as a solo act performing and teaching ukulele and steel guitar at festivals and music camps.

Awards and recognitions 
1993 – Won the WEMU Jazz Competition (solo artist category)

2010 – Won the 2010 Hawaii Music Awards Steel Guitar category.

2010 – The aNueNue Ukulele company issued the Gerald Ross Signature Tenor Ukulele.

2011 – Became an artist/endorser for Mya-Moe Ukuleles.

2011 – Became an online columnist for Mel Bay's "Ukulele Sessions".

2011 – Became an endorser for MI-SI instrument pickups.

2012 – Became an endorser for the Kala U-Bass.

2013 – Named Mya-Moe Ukulele Artist of the Month (June)

2013 – Became the Music Director for the annual Ashokan Uke Fest (2013-2019).

2014 – Gerald's steel guitar work was featured on the Hula Honey's CD 'A Hui Ho'.
The CD won the Na Hoku Hanonano Award (Hawaiian Grammys – Jazz category)

2015 – Named UkeFarm Radio Artist of the Month (January)

2018 - Became an endorser for Henriksen amplifiers. Featured in Henriksen advertisement - Ukulele Magazine, Winter 2017, Spring & Summer 2018, Winter 2019.

2020 - Ukulele Magazine Fall 2020. Full page feature story about Gerald’s two month musical lockdown during the Covid-19 pandemic in Spain

2021 - Gerald and Marcy Marxer hosted the awards presentation at the World Virtual Ukulele Contest sponsored by CF Martin guitars

2021 - Ukulele Magazine Winter 2021. A four page feature article profiling Gerald entitled ‘King Of Swing’

2022 - Ukulele Magazine Online. Gerald performs his arrangement of 'Christmas Time Is Here' online in the magazine's Holiday edition.

Lost World String Band 
Gerald Ross played guitar, ukulele, Cajun accordion and steel guitar with the LWSB from 1979 - 2011.  The Lost World appeared numerous times on American Public Media's A Prairie Home Companion with Garrison Keillor. The band's reputation for on-stage spontaneity and humor secured them a spot as the featured musical act at New York's famed comedy club The Improv for the 1982 New Year's show.

2020 Covid-19 Lockdown - Oviedo, Spain 
In March 2020 a brief work/vacation in Oviedo, Spain became a fifty four day lockdown for Ross and his wife Margaret. Neither contracted Covid-19.  Ross recorded four instrumental ukulele videos during the lockdown.  
Besame Mucho
Sunday
Magnetic Rag
Music To Watch Girls By

Discography

Solo 
 Romance & Adventure 
 Ukulele Stomp 
 Moonlight And Shadows 
 Ukulele Hit Parade 
 Mistletoe Mazel Tov
 Swing Ukulele
 Absolute Uke

Collaborations 
 Stoney Creek – Meet The Creek 
 Lost World String Band – Ready To Wear 
 After 10 Years – Elderly Instruments (w/MacPherson Strutters)
 Sally Rogers – In The Circle of the Sun 
 Wheatland Festival – At This Stage – 30 Years at the Wheatland Festival
 Various Ukulele Artists – Square Pegs And Round Holes 
 Yiddishe Cup – Klezmer Guy 
 Greg Gattuso (Hilo Greg) – Little Songs For Big Kids 
 Bosko & Honey Present... Ukulele Safari Volume 1 
 The Beatles Complete on Ukulele – Paperback Writer 
 The Beatles Complete on Ukulele – Penny Lane
 Katseye – Makin' Lemonade
 The Hula Honeys – A Hui Hou
 Tree Town Ukes – Veterans Song (guitar)
 Phil Doleman - And (guitar, bass, Dobro - UK release)
Shawano Folk Festival - 40 years

Music Festival Appearances 

Ross makes appearances at a wide variety of venues as documented below.  At most events there are workshops where he teaches participants aspects of the ukulele or steel guitar.

Europe etc.
 Ukulele Festival of Great Britain – Cheltenham, England
 Sevilla Ukulele Festival – Sevilla, Spain
 Ukulele Ceilidh – Liverpool, Nova Scotia, Canada
 Montreal Uke Fest – Montreal, Quebec, Canada
 Ukulele Festival Of Scotland - Dumfries, Scotland
 Vancouver Ukulele Festival – Vancouver, British Columbia, Canada
 Hawaii Island Ukulele Retreat - Big Island, Hawaii
 Czech Ukulele Festival - Prague, Czech Republic
 Royal City Uke Fest - Guelph, Ontario, Canada
 Ukulele Bike And Barge - Avignon, France

USA East

Augusta Heritage Swing Week – Elkins, WV
 Ashokan Western & Swing Week – Olivebridge, NY
 Swannanoa Gathering – Guitar Week – Asheville, NC
 Strathmore Uke/Guitar Summit – Bethesda, MD
 New York Uke Fest – NY, NY
 M.A.U.I. Ukefest – Annapolis, MD
 New Jersey Uke Fest - Morristown, NJ
 Steve Kaufman’s Acoustic Camp - Maryville, TN
 The Kalamazoo Fretboard Festival – Kalamazoo, MI
 Wheatland Festival – Remus, MI
 Midwest Uke Fest – Indianapolis, IN
 Milwaukee Uke Fest – Milwaukee, WI
 Bliss Fest – Cross Village, MI
 Windy City Uke Fest – Chicago, IL
 Tampa Bay Ukulele Getaway – Tampa, FL
 UkeFest at the Music Center at Strathmore – Bethesda, MD
 UkeFest Virginia – Richmond, VA
 Mighty Uke Day II, IV, V, XI – Lansing, MI
 Great Bear Music Festival – Bloomingdale, MI
 Ashokan Uke Fest – Olivebridge, NY
 Midwest Uke Fest – Ft. Wayne, IN
 HSGA Hawaiian Music Festival – Joliet, IL
 Belfast Ukulele Festival - Belfast, ME
 Lake Anne Ukulele Festival – Reston, VA
 Uketoberfest Interlochen – Interlochen, MI
 Ukulele Festival of South Florida - Fort Lauderdale, FL 
 Funky Frets Uke Fest - Philadelphia, PA
 Allegheny Ukulele Soiree - Altoona, PA
 Midwest Uke Camp - Olivet, MI/Holland, MI
 Guitar Intensives - Bar Harbor, ME
 City Of Lights Uke Fest - Aurora, IL
 Nutmeg Uke Fest - Simsbury, CT

USA West
 Puget Sound Guitar Workshop – Bremerton, WA
 Palm Springs Uke Fest - Palm Springs, CA
 Wine Country Uke Fest – Napa, CA
 Portland Uke Fest – Portland, OR
 Reno Uke Fest - Reno, NV
 Denver Uke Fest - Denver, CO
 Port Townsend Ukulele Festival - Port Townsend, WA
 Uke U-7 - Bend, OR
 Southern California Uke Fest, Los Angeles, CA
 Uketoberfest – Eugene, OR
 Lone Star UkeFest – Dallas, TX
 West Coast Ukulele Retreat – Pacific Grove, CA
 The California Coast Music Camp – Foresthill, CA
 Mighty Mo Uke Fest – St. Louis, MO
 Menucha Ukulele Band Camp –  Portland, OR
 Hawaiian Steel Guitar Festival –  Fort Collins, CO
 Colorado Roots Music Camp - Colorado Springs, CO
 NAMM Show - Los Angeles, CA
 Rocky Mountain Uke Fest - Durango, CO
 Ukekopelli Festival - Albuquerque, NM
 Great Minnesota Uke And Bluegrass Gathering - Minneapolis, MN

Appears in
 Kazoozie Kazoos TV commercial (uncredited – performer/actor and announcer)
 Mighty Uke (uncredited – playing steel guitar at the New York Uke Fest)
 Wheatland – The First 40 Years (Photos and soundtrack with the Lost World String Band)

References

External links
Gerald Ross website
Gerald Ross Signature aNueNue Ukulele

1954 births
Living people
American ukulele players
Na Hoku Hanohano Award winners